Sir Harold Beckwith Whitehouse FRCS FRCOG (1882–1943) was professor of midwifery and diseases of women at the University of Birmingham. He served with the Royal Army Medical Corps during the First World War at No. 8 General Hospital in Rouen and No. 56 Hospital in Etaples. He was a foundation fellow of the Royal College of Obstetricians and Gynaecologists.

References

1882 births
1943 deaths
20th-century British medical doctors
Royal Army Medical Corps officers
British Army personnel of World War I
Academics of the University of Birmingham
Fellows of the Royal College of Obstetricians and Gynaecologists
Fellows of the Royal College of Surgeons
English knights